Hyannis is a village in Grant County, Nebraska. The population was 165 at the time of the 2020 census. It is the county seat of Grant County. It is centrally located in the extensive, unique, and remote region of grasslands known as the Sandhills of Nebraska at the intersection of two Nebraska State Highways: NSH 61 which runs north and south, and NSH 2, which runs east and west.

History
Hyannis was laid out in 1888 when the Chicago, Burlington and Quincy Railroad was extended to that point. It was named after the village of Hyannis, Massachusetts by a railroad official.

Geography
Hyannis is located at  (42.000817, -101.765202), in the Nebraska Sandhills.

Demographics

2010 census
As of the census of 2010, there were 182 people, 98 households, and 61 families residing in the village. The racial makeup of the village was 97.8% White and 2.2% from two or more races. Hispanic or Latino of any race were 1.6% of the population.

There were 98 households, of which 12.2% had children under the age of 18 living with them, 56.1% were married couples living together, 4.1% had a female householder with no husband present, 2.0% had a male householder with no wife present, and 37.8% were non-families. 33.7% of all households were made up of individuals, and 15.3% had someone living alone who was 65 years of age or older. The average household size was 1.86 and the average family size was 2.30.

The median age in the village was 54.2 years. 12.1% of residents were under the age of 18; 4.9% were between the ages of 18 and 24; 14.2% were from 25 to 44; 38.3% were from 45 to 64; and 30.2% were 65 years of age or older. The gender makeup of the village was 50.0% male and 50.0% female.

2000 census
As of the census of 2000, there were 287 people, 116 households, and 88 families residing in the village. The population density was 422.8 people per square mile (163.0/km2). There were 165 housing units at an average density of 243.1 per square mile (93.7/km2). The racial makeup of the village was 98.61% White, 1.39% from other races. Hispanic or Latino of any race were 2.79% of the population.

There were 116 households, out of which 36.2% had children under the age of 18 living with them, 64.7% were married couples living together, 9.5% had a female householder with no husband present, and 23.3% were non-families. 23.3% of all households were made up of individuals, and 9.5% had someone living alone who was 65 years of age or older. The average household size was 2.47 and the average family size was 2.91.

In the village, the population was spread out, with 28.2% under the age of 18, 5.6% from 18 to 24, 24.7% from 25 to 44, 26.5% from 45 to 64, and 15.0% who were 65 years of age or older. The median age was 41 years. For every 100 females, there were 111.0 males. For every 100 females age 18 and over, there were 102.0 males.

As of 2000 the median income for a household in the village was $29,688, and the median income for a family was $35,313. Males had a median income of $26,000 versus $13,906 for females. The per capita income for the village was $13,906. About 4.7% of families and 6.0% of the population were below the poverty line, including 9.1% of those under the age of eighteen and none of those 65 or over.

Notable people
Al Davis, former member of the Nebraska Legislature
Skeeter Thurston, retired rodeo competitor

References

Villages in Grant County, Nebraska
Villages in Nebraska
County seats in Nebraska
Populated places established in 1888
1888 establishments in Nebraska